Locomotion is a railway-related magazine published irregularly in Australia by the Australian Railway Historical Society, New South Wales Division. It is edited by the same team who produce Railway Digest.

Aim 
The editorial slant is towards locomotives, both steam and diesel.

ISSN

Issues 
 Summer 2008 (January) was Issue 1. It concentrated on diesel locomotives
 Winter 2008 (August) was Issue 2. It concentrated on steam locomotives and included overseas preserved items.

See also 
 List of railroad-related periodicals

References

Rail transport magazines published in Australia
Magazines established in 2008
2008 establishments in Australia
Mass media in New South Wales
Irregularly published magazines